Gane is both a surname and a given name. Notable people with the name include:

Surname:
Alan Gane (born 1950), English former amateur footballer and manager
Chris Gane (born 1974), English professional golfer
Christopher P. Gane (born 1938) is a British/American computer scientist
Constantin Gane (1885–1962), Romanian writer
Ciryl Gane (born 1990), French mixed martial artist
Ionel Gane (born 1971), retired Romanian football player
Jeremy Gane, the managing director of Gane and Marshall International Ltd
John Gane (1837–1895), British politician
Lucinda Gane (born 1949), British actress, played Miss Terri Mooney in the UK TV serial Grange Hill
Nicolae Gane (1838–1916), Romanian writer and politician
Tim Gane (born 1964), British musician
Given name:
Gane Todorovski (1929–2010), Macedonian poet, translator, essayist, literary critic, historian, publicist

See also
Ali Gane, small town in western-central Senegal
Gane language, spoken in Indonesia
Gane Pavilion, temporary building designed by Marcel Breuer and F. R. S. Yorke, built in Bristol, UK
Henry Gane House, historic house at 121 Adena Road in Newton, Massachusetts
Mokume-gane, a mixed-metal laminate with distinctive layered patterns
Ganes (disambiguation)

Romanian-language surnames